The Nuclear Explosions (Prohibition and Inspections) Act 1998 (c. 7) is an Act of the Parliament of the United Kingdom to implement and enforce the Comprehensive Test Ban Treaty of 1996. It is not yet in force.

The Act explicitly declares that to knowingly cause a nuclear explosion, for a test or any other reason, will be an offence, and punishable by life imprisonment and confiscation of anything relating to the offence. The only exception is where the explosion is deemed to have been carried out in the course of an armed conflict – if a question arises over this then the Secretary of State for Defence decides and issues a certificate of his determination. The Act will apply to any explosion caused within the United Kingdom, or caused elsewhere by British nationals or corporations.

The Act will also allow for on-site inspection parties as mandated by the treaty, and criminalise any attempts to wilfully obstruct such inspections. It will also grant powers to enter and search premises if a justice of the peace is satisfied that there is reasonable ground for suspecting that an offence is being, has been or is about to be committed.

The final section of the Act states that the Act does not come into effect until a minister signs an order declaring the date on which it is to become effective. This has not yet been done. However the Anti-terrorism, Crime and Security Act 2001, which is in force, includes offences relating to nuclear weapons.

See also

Nuclear Material (Offences) Act 1983

External links
Full text of the Nuclear Explosions (Prohibition and Inspections) Act 1998
Part 6 of the Anti-terrorism, Crime and Security Act 2001

United Kingdom Acts of Parliament 1998